Rainer Kumm was a German rugby player, who played fly-half for the German national team as well as the German Sevens team, a team he captained in the late 1990s.

Kumm was a member of the German national team which toured Canada in 1988 and later competed in the erstwhile FIRA Tournaments. He was also part of the Germany sevens squads, which won  the Bowl final of the 1990 Hong Kong Sevens, reached the Plate Final of the 1997 Punta Del Este Sevens, won the Bowl Final of the 1997 Paris Sevens, and contested the Bowl Final of the 2000 IRB Sevens World Series tournament in Punta del Este.

He played club rugby for TSV Victoria Linden in Hanover, with whom he won the German Championship in 1987, 1989, 1993, 1994 and 1996, and contested further finals in 1991, 1995, 1997, 1998 and 2000. Kumm also captained Victoria Linden to the German Sevens Championship in 2000.

After Kumm's retirement he took over from Gerhard Barthel as coach of the Germany national sevens team.

References 

Living people
German rugby union coaches
German rugby union players
Germany international rugby union players
TSV Victoria Linden players
Rugby union fly-halves
Sportspeople from Hanover
Year of birth missing (living people)